English Teachers
 Teaching English as a foreign language
 English Teachers (TV series), a Canadian documentary television series